Probable G-protein coupled receptor 12 is a protein that in humans is encoded by the GPR12 gene.

The gene product of GPR12 is an orphan receptor, meaning that its endogenous ligand is currently unknown. Gene disruption of GPR12 in mice results in dyslipidemia and obesity.

Ligands
Inverse agonists 
 Cannabidiol

References

Further reading 

 

G protein-coupled receptors